Metrophanes, Chi Sung (Cháng Yángjí,常楊吉, his Chinese name is also sometimes translated as Tsi Chung) or Mitrophan (December 10, 1855 – June 10, 1900) was the first Chinese Eastern Orthodox priest to be martyred. He was killed with his family members and church followers in 1900 during the Boxer Rebellion. He is the best known of some 222 Holy Chinese Martyrs glorified in August 2000 by the Eastern Orthodox Church. Metrophanes was stabbed in the chest by a crowd of rebels. Also considered martyrs are his wife Tatiana, whose Chinese name was Li, his sons, 23-year-old Isaiah and eight-year-old John, and Isaiah's nineteen-year-old fiancee Maria, who were all killed with him.

Metrophanes was raised by his mother, Marina, and grandmother, Ekaterina, after his father died when he was a child. He was a shy, unassuming man who was educated for the priesthood at a Russian Ecclesiastical Mission in China. Church authorities urged him to become a priest, but they persuaded him to do so with difficulty because he did not believe he had the talents necessary. "A man of poor talent and little virtue, how dare I accept this great rank?" he said. Metrophanes was ordained by Nikolai, Bishop of Japan in 1880. He helped with translation of liturgical books into Chinese from Russian and proofreading. Eventually he suffered a breakdown and settled outside the mission, receiving half of his salary. Many people took advantage of his goodwill or mocked him.

Boxer Rebellion
During the Boxer Rebellion, the Boxers burned down his print shop and church site. He tried to encourage fellow members of the church during the rebellion. On the night of June 10, rebels surrounded his house and killed Metrophanes along with many of the seventy people inside. Metrophanes was stabbed to death under a date tree.

His son Isaiah or Esaias, who served in the Chinese military, was beheaded on June 7 near the Ping-tse-Min gates by rebels who knew he was a Christian. Metrophanes' wife, Tatiana, age forty-four, escaped the house with Isaiah's fiancee, Maria, but Tatiana was beheaded on June 12 along with other Christians. Maria had come to Metrophanes' house two days before the attack, determined to stay with her dead fiance's family despite the danger. She had been urged three times by Metrophanes' middle son Sergei (Cháng Fú, 常福) to run away and hide, but refused to leave. She helped many others escape, but she chose to remain with Isaiah's family, where she was also eventually murdered by the Boxers. Eight-year-old Ioann or John was attacked brutally on June 10, 1900 by the Boxers who—by some reports—chopped off his nose, ears, and toes and hacked away at his shoulders. Maria concealed the little boy in the outhouse, where he survived the attack. The next day, according to the reports of followers, he was seen sitting naked on the steps outside the house, begging for water, which his neighbors refused him. Their children mocked him and called him a follower of devils. John reportedly replied, "I am a believer in God, and not a follower of devils." Others asked him if his wounds hurt and the child reportedly replied, "It does not hurt to suffer for Christ." He was later taken away again by a crowd of Boxers to be murdered, but seemed to show no fear. One old man protested as he was led away, "What is the boy's fault? Blame the parents for his becoming a devil's disciple." Others in the crowd jeered at him.

Canonizations
Hundreds of other Chinese Orthodox Christians were also murdered during the Boxer Rebellion and are also considered martyrs by their church and remembered with their bishop. Roman Catholic and Protestant Chinese and foreign missionaries were killed as well. Though the communist government in China criticized the Roman Catholic Church for canonizing 120 Chinese and foreign martyrs in October 2000, similar criticism had not occurred two months earlier during the Orthodox canonizations. The smaller size of the Eastern Orthodox Church, its lower profile in China, and/or the better relations between the Orthodox Church and the Chinese government may account for the disparity.

References

External links
Akathist to the Chinese Martyrs Saints of the Boxer Rebellion
Stars of the Orient: New Martyrs of China

1855 births
1900 deaths
19th-century Eastern Orthodox martyrs
19th-century Christian saints
Chinese saints of the Eastern Orthodox Church
Qing dynasty translators
Translators from Russian
Translators to Chinese
Deaths by stabbing in China
People murdered in China
Chinese murder victims
Chinese people of the Boxer Rebellion
19th-century translators
China–Russian Empire relations